Imad Yassin is the leader of Jund Ash Sham's military wing.  He is a dropout of Abu Mohjen's Osbat al-Ansar, which has long been considered a terrorist organization by the United States, due to its connection with Osama bin Laden's al-Qaida network.

He is also an emir of Islamic State of Iraq and the Levant and was arrested by Lebanese Security forces on 22 September 2016 in Ain al-Hilweh refugee camp.

References

Living people
Year of birth missing (living people)
Salafi jihadists